This page documents all tornadoes confirmed by various weather forecast offices of the National Weather Service in the United States from January to February 2013.

United States yearly total

January

January 10 event

January 12 event

January 13 event

January 29 event

January 30 event

February

February 10 event

February 14 event

February 18 event

February 19 event

February 21 event

February 24 event

February 25 event

February 26 event

See also
 List of United States tornadoes from October to December 2012
 Tornadoes of 2013

 List of United States tornadoes from March to April 2013

Notes

References

Tornadoes of 2013
2013 natural disasters in the United States
2013, 01
January 2013 events in the United States
February 2013 events in the United States